Deyverson Brum Silva Acosta (born 8 May 1991), also known as "Deyvinho", or simply known as Deyverson, is a Brazilian professional footballer who plays as a forward for Cuiabá.

Club career

Early career
Born in Santa Margarida, a neighborhood in Rio de Janeiro, Deyverson began his career with lowly local side Grêmio Mangaratibense in 2011. Known as Acosta at the time, he made his senior debut on 10 March 2011, starting and scoring the opener in a 2–0 Campeonato Carioca Série C home win against Duquecaxiense.

During his two-year period at Mangaratibense, Deyverson scored 18 goals in 31 appearances, being his side's top goalscorer in the two Carioca Série C editions where he played.

Benfica
On 5 September 2012, after a trial period, Deyverson joined Benfica on a three-year deal.
He was placed on the reserve side and made his debut on 19 September 2012, against Tondela. His first goal was in the immediate matchday, scoring the winner in a 2–1 away victory at Oliveirense. He scored 8 league goals throughout the season, being on the starting eleven only 12 times.

Belenenses
On 6 August 2013, Deyverson joined Belenenses, signing a four-year deal. After settling as the main striker in 2014–15, he scored the only goal in a 1–1 draw at Alvalade.

On 2 February 2015, Deyverson signed a six-month loan deal with Bundesliga team, 1. FC Köln. He scored his first goal on 8 March 2015, against Eintracht Frankfurt.

Levante
On 27 July 2015, Deyverson signed a four-year deal with La Liga side Levante UD, for a rumoured €2 million fee. He made his debut in the category on 23 August, starting in a 1–2 home loss against Celta de Vigo.

Deyverson scored his first goal in the main category of Spanish football on 23 September 2015, scoring a last-minute equalizer in a 2–2 home draw against SD Eibar. On 22 November, he contributed with a brace in a 3–0 away win against Sporting de Gijón, taking his tally up to four goals in ten matches.

On 21 July 2016, after Levante's relegation, Deyverson signed a one-year loan deal with Deportivo Alavés also in the top level, with a buyout clause. On 10 September he scored his first goal for the club, netting the first in a 2–1 historical win against FC Barcelona at the Camp Nou.

Palmeiras
On 11 July 2017 Deyverson returned to his homeland, after agreeing to a five-year contract with Palmeiras. He helped the club lift the 2018 Campeonato Brasileiro Série A by scoring nine goals, but subsequently fell down the packing order after the arrival of Luiz Adriano.

On 21 January 2020, Deyverson returned to Spain after agreeing to a loan deal with Getafe CF in the first division for the remainder of the campaign. On 23 August, he returned to Alavés also in a temporary deal.

On 27 November 2021, Deyverson scored the winning goal in the final of the Copa Libertadores in the 5th minute of extra time, following a defensive error from Flamengo midfielder Andreas Pereira and was elected the Man of the Match.

Cuiabá
On 4 August 2022, Deyverson joined Série A club Cuiabá on a free transfer.

Club statistics

Honours
Palmeiras
Campeonato Brasileiro Série A: 2018
Copa Libertadores: 2021
Recopa Sudamericana: 2022
Campeonato Paulista: 2022

References

External links

1991 births
Living people
Footballers from Rio de Janeiro (city)
Brazilian footballers
Association football forwards
Campeonato Brasileiro Série A players
Sociedade Esportiva Palmeiras players
Cuiabá Esporte Clube players
Liga Portugal 2 players
Primeira Liga players
S.L. Benfica B players
C.F. Os Belenenses players
Bundesliga players
1. FC Köln players
La Liga players
Levante UD footballers
Deportivo Alavés players
Getafe CF footballers
Brazilian expatriate footballers
Expatriate footballers in Portugal
Brazilian expatriate sportspeople in Portugal
Expatriate footballers in Germany
Brazilian expatriate sportspeople in Germany
Expatriate footballers in Spain
Brazilian expatriate sportspeople in Spain